Nicolaas Jan Dirk "Nico" Nagelkerke (born 1951) is a Dutch biostatistician and epidemiologist. As of 2012, he was a professor of biostatistics at the United Arab Emirates University. He previously taught at the University of Leiden in the Netherlands. He has now been retired for several years but as of now (January 2023) he is still active in research.

He is well known in epidemiology thanks to his invention of what is now known as the "Nagelkerke R2", which is one of a number of generalisations of the coefficient of determination from linear regression to logistic regression, see
Pseudo-R-squared, Coefficient of determination, Logistic regression.

References

Living people
1951 births
Dutch statisticians
Dutch epidemiologists
Biostatisticians
Leiden University alumni
University of Amsterdam alumni
Academic staff of Leiden University
Academic staff of United Arab Emirates University